The 4708th Air Defense Wing is a discontinued United States Air Force organization.  Its last assignment was with the 30th Air Division of Air Defense Command (ADC) at Selfridge Air Force Base (AFB), Michigan, where it was discontinued in 1956.  It was established in 1952 at Selfridge as the 4708th Defense Wing in a general reorganization of Air Defense Command (ADC), which replaced wings responsible for a base with wings responsible for a geographical area.   It assumed control of several fighter Interceptor squadrons that had been assigned to the 56th Fighter-Interceptor Wing, some of which were Air National Guard squadrons mobilized for the Korean War.

In early 1953 it also was assigned nine radar squadrons in the Midwest. Several of these radar squadrons were located in Canada as part of the Mid-Canada Line.  At the same time its dispersed fighter squadrons combined with colocated air base squadrons into air defense groups.  The wing was redesignated as an air defense wing in 1954. It was discontinued in and its units transferred to the 30th Air Division in 1956.

History

The wing was organized as the 4708th Defense Wing the beginning of February 1952 at Selfridge AFB, Michigan as part of a major reorganization of ADC responding to ADC's difficulty under the existing wing base organizational structure in deploying fighter squadrons to best advantage. It assumed operational control and the air defense mission of fighter squadrons formerly assigned to the inactivating 56th Fighter-Interceptor Wing (FIW). The 61st Fighter-Interceptor Squadron (FIS), flying Lockheed F-94 Starfire aircraft, and the 172d FIS, flying World War II era North American F-51 Mustang aircraft were located at Selfridge, while the 63d FIS, flying F-86 Sabre aircraft, was located at Oscoda AFB.  The 136th FIS at Niagara Falls Municipal Airport, flying World War II era Republic F-47 Thunderbolt aircraft was also transferred to the wing from the 101st FIW, and the 71st FIS at Greater Pittsburgh Airport, another F-86 unit, was transferred from the 1st FIW. The support elements of the 56th FIW's 56th Air Base Group and 56th Maintenance & Supply Group were replaced at Selfridge by the wing's 575th Air Base Group, and air base squadrons were activated at each of the dispersed locations assigned to the wing to support the fighter squadrons at those stations. The wing's mission was to train and maintain tactical units in a state of readiness to intercept and destroy enemy aircraft attempting to penetrate the air defense system in the Great Lakes area.

In July 1952, units at Oscoda AFB were transferred to the 4706th Defense Wing, while in the following month, the 166th FIS, at Youngstown Municipal Airport, where it flew Republic F-84 Thunderjet aircraft was transferred from the 4706th.  In November, the federalized Air National Guard (ANG) squadrons were returned to state control.  The 136th FIS was returned to the New York ANG and replaced by the 47th FIS, the 166th FIS was returned to the Ohio ANG and replaced by the 86th FIS, and the 172nd FIS was returned to the Michigan ANG, and replaced by the 431st FIS. Another F-51 squadron, the 56th FIS, was activated at Selfridge later that month. although it converted to F-86 aircraft by the start of 1953.

In February 1953, another major reorganization of ADC activated Air Defense Groups at ADC bases with dispersed fighter squadrons.  These groups were assigned to the wing and assumed direct control of the interceptor squadrons at those bases, as well as support squadrons to carry out their role as the USAF host organizations at the bases.  As a result of this reorganization, the 575th Air Base Group was redesignated the 575th Air Defense Gp and assumed control of the fighter squadrons at Selfridge, while the 500th Air Defense Group at Pittsburgh and the 502d Air Defense Group at Youngstown controlled the squadrons at these locations. Oscoda AFB (now renamed Wurtsmith AFB), where the 527th Air Defense Group was activated, returned to the control of the wing.   Although the 518th Air Defense Group took over operations at Niagara Falls, it was assigned to another wing. The reorganization also resulted in the wing adding the radar detection, control and warning mission, and it was assigned eight Aircraft Control & Warning Squadrons (AC&W Sq) in the United States and Canada to perform this mission. In November it added an additional AC&W Sq.

In 1955, ADC implemented Project Arrow, which was designed to bring back on the active list the fighter units which had compiled memorable records in the two world wars. As a result of this project, the 500th Air Defense Gp was replaced by the 54th Fighter Group (Air Defense), the 502nd Air Def Gp was replaced by the 79th Fighter Group (Air Defense), the 527th Air Def Gp was replaced by the 412th Fighter Group (Air Defense), and the 575th Air Defense Gp was replaced by the 1st Fighter Group (Air Defense).

In March 1956, the 4711th Air Defense Wing moved to Selfridge from Presque Isle AFB, Maine and three of the 4708th's AC&W Sqs were assigned to it. Niagara Falls briefly was assigned to the wing in this realignment. The fighter groups and remaining radar detection and control squadrons of the wing were transferred to the 30th Air Division in July. With no remaining operational mission, the wing and the 4711th Wing were discontinued in July 1956 They would be replaced shortly by the 1st Fighter Wing (Air Defense), which was activated on 18 October 1956.

Lineage
 Designated as the 4708th Defense Wing and organized on 1 February 1952
 Redesignated as 4708th Air Defense Wing on 1 July 1954
 Discontinued on 8 July 1956

Assignments
 Eastern Air Defense Force, 1 February 1952
 30th Air Division, 16 February 1953 – 18 October 1956

Stations
 Selfridge AFB, Michigan, 1 February 1952 – 18 October 1956

Components

Groups

Fighter Groups
 1st Fighter Group (Air Defense), 18 August 1955 – 8 July 1956
 15th Fighter Group (Air Defense)
 Niagara Falls Municipal Airport, New York, 1 March 1956 – 8 July 1956
 54th Fighter Group (Air Defense)
 Greater Pittsburgh Airport, Pennsylvania, 18 August 1955 – 8 July 1956
 79th Fighter Group (Air Defense)
 Youngstown Municipal Airport, Ohio, 18 August 1955 – 8 July 1956
 412th Fighter Group (Air Defense)
 Wurtsmith AFB 18 August 1955 – 8 July 1956

Air Defense Groups
 500th Air Defense Group
 Greater Pittsburgh Airport, 16 February 1953 – 18 August 1955
 502d Air Defense Group
 Youngstown Municipal Airport, Ohio, 16 February 1953 – 18 August 1955
 527th Air Defense Group
 Wurtsmith AFB, 16 February 1953 – 18 August 1955
 575th Air Base Group (later 575th Air Defense Group), 1 February 1952 – 18 August 1955

Squadrons

Fighter Squadrons
 47th Fighter-Interceptor Squadron, 1 December 1952 – 16 February 1953
 Niagara Falls Municipal Airport
 56th Fighter-Interceptor Squadron, 27 November 1952 – 16 February 1953
 61st Fighter-Interceptor Squadron, 6 February 1952 – 16 February 1953
 63d Fighter-Interceptor Squadron, 6 February 1952 – 1 July 1952
 Oscoda AFB, Michigan
 71st Fighter-Interceptor Squadron
 Greater Pittsburgh Airport, Pennsylvania, 6 February 1952 – 16 February 1953
 86th Fighter-Interceptor Squadron
 Youngstown Municipal Airport, Ohio, 1 November 1952 – 16 February 1953
 136th Fighter-Interceptor Squadron
 Niagara Falls Municipal Airport, New York, 6 February 1952 – 1 November 1952
 166th Fighter-Interceptor Squadron
 Youngstown Municipal Airport, Ohio, ca. 1 August 1952 – 1 November 1952
 172nd Fighter-Interceptor Squadron, 6 February 1952 – 1 November 1952
 431st Fighter-Interceptor Squadron, 1 November 1952 – 16 February 1953

Support Squadrons
 76th Air Base Squadron
 Niagara Falls Municipal Airport, New York, 1 February 1952 – 16 February 1953
 81st Air Base Squadron
 Greater Pittsburgh Airport, Pennsylvania, 1 February 1952 – 16 February 1953
 84th Air Base Squadron
 Oscoda AFB, Michigan, 1 February 1952 – 1 July 1952
 88th Air Base Squadron
 Youngstown Municipal Airport, Ohio, 1 February 1952 – 16 February 1953

Radar Squadrons
 661st Aircraft Control and Warning Squadron, 16 February 1953 – 8 July 1956
 662d Aircraft Control and Warning Squadron
 Brookfield AFS, Ohio, 16 February 1953 – 8 July 1956
 677th Aircraft Control and Warning Squadron
 Willow Run AFS, Michigan, 5 May 1954, Alpena, Michigan, 1 December 1954 – 8 July 1956
 752d Aircraft Control and Warning Squadron
 Empire AFS, Michigan, 16 February 1953 – 1 March 1956
 754th Aircraft Control and Warning Squadron
 Port Austin AFS, Michigan, 16 February 1953 – 8 July 1956
 781st Aircraft Control and Warning Squadron
 Fort Custer, Michigan, 1 November 1953 – 8 July 1956
 783d Aircraft Control and Warning Squadron
 Guthrie AFS, West Virginia, 16 February 1953 – 1 March 1956
 809th Aircraft Control and Warning Squadron
 Willow Run AFS, Michigan, 1 May 1954, Owingsville AFS, Kentucky, ca.1 December 1954 – 1 March 1956
 912th Aircraft Control and Warning Squadron
 Ramore AS, Ontario, 16 February 1953 – 8 July 1956
 913th Aircraft Control and Warning Squadron
 Pagwa AS, Ontario, 16 February 1953 – 8 July 1956
 914th Aircraft Control and Warning Squadron
 Armstrong AS, Ontario, 16 February 1953 – 8 July 1956

Aircraft

 F-47D, 1952
 F-51D, 1952–1953
 F-84C, 1952
 F-86A, 1952

 F-86D, 1953–1955
 F-86F, 1952–1954
 F-89D, 1955
 F-94B, 1952–1953

Commanders
 Col. George S. Brown, 1 February 1952 – ca. 31 March 1952
 Col. Francis R. Royal, ca. 1 April 1952 – 16 July 1953
 Col. George B. Greene, Jr., 16 July 1953 – unknown

See also
 List of MAJCOM wings
 List of United States Air Force Aerospace Defense Command Interceptor Squadrons
 List of United States Air Force aircraft control and warning squadrons

References

Notes

Bibliography

 Buss, Lydus H.(ed), Sturm, Thomas A., Volan, Denys, and McMullen, Richard F., History of Continental Air Defense Command and Air Defense Command July to December 1955, Directorate of Historical Services, Air Defense Command, Ent AFB, CO, (1956)
 
 Grant, C.L., (1961) The Development of Continental Air Defense to 1 September 1954, USAF Historical Study No. 126

Further reading
 
 
 

Four Digit Wings of the United States Air Force
Air defense wings of the United States Air Force
Aerospace Defense Command units
Military units and formations established in 1952
Military units and formations in Michigan
1952 establishments in Michigan
1956 disestablishments in Michigan